The capture of Demerara and Essequibo was a French military expedition carried out in January 1782 as part of the American Revolutionary War. In 1781 Admiral Lord Rodney sent two sloops from his fleet at Sint Eustatius to take possession of the Dutch colonies of Essequibo and Demerara. In 1782 the French successfully took possession of these settlements, compelling British Governor Robert Kingston to surrender. The Treaty of Paris in 1783 restored these territories to the Dutch.

Background

In December 1780 Great Britain declared war on the Dutch Republic, bringing it formally into the 4th Anglo-Dutch War. In early 1781 a large British fleet under Admiral Lord Rodney was sent to the West Indies. After making seizures in the Caribbean islands, Rodney sent two sloops to take possession of the colonies of Essequibo and Demerara with little difficulty. The colonies had already de facto surrendered to six British privateer ships by the time the two naval vessels arrived. The governor, Van Schuilenburg, was not satisfied with Dutch protection and surrendered to the British, who found a rich booty in the colonies from the vast quantity of produce that had accumulated due to a lack of shipping.

French capture

French naval captain Armand de Kersaint, with his 32-gun flagship Iphigénie, the 26-gun Aimable, and three lesser ships, arrived at Demerara with little opposition. A French force of 335 men from the Régiment d'Armagnac and the 1st Legion Volontaires étranger de la Marine launched an assault on the British garrison and compelled Gov. Robert Kingston and his detachment from the 28th Regiment of Foot to surrender. As a result, Essequibo and Berbice also surrendered to the French on 1 and 5 February.

The French seized five Royal Navy vessels: the 20-gun Orinoque (Commander William Tahourdin), 16-gun Barbuda (Commander Francis Pender), 18-gun Sylph (Commander Lawrence Graeme), 16-gun Stormont (Commander Christmas Paul), and 16-gun brig Rodney (Lieutenant John Douglas Brisbane).

Aftermath 

The Comte de Kersaint became governor of the three rivers and their settlements and inhabitants. To guarantee their conquest, the French began to construct forts at the mouth of the Demerara River, one on each eastern and western bank, and for that purpose, they compelled the planters to furnish slave labor. They also doubled the capitation tax, which burden was felt severely by the colonists. In 1783 the Treaty of Paris restored these territories to the Dutch. When Demerara surrendered to the French, the British naval commander in place signed the capitulation. Gov. Kingston's proposals for terms contained the following rather singular proposition:

To this the following answer was returned:

Notes

References 
Chartrand, René (1992) The French Army in the American War of Independence. (Osprey). 

Hadden, James (2009) Hadden's Journal and Orderly Books. (Applewood). 
Henry, Dalton G. (1855) The History of British Guiana: Comprising a General Description of the Colony: A narrative of some of the principal events from the earliest period of products and natural history. 
Marley, F. David. (1998) Wars of the Americas: A Chronology of Armed Conflict in the New World, 1492 to the Present. (ABC-CLIO) 

Conflicts in 1782
Naval battles of the American Revolutionary War
Naval battles involving France
Naval battles involving Great Britain
History of Guyana
1782 in the Caribbean
Essequibo River